Tomas Krnan is a Canadian chess International Master.

Chess career
He has represented his country in a number of chess olympiads, including 2006 and 2016.

He played in the Chess World Cup 2015, being defeated by Ding Liren in the first round.

References

External links 

Tomas Krnan chess games at 365Chess.com

1988 births
Living people
Canadian chess players